If Lucy Fell is a post-hardcore/mathcore band from Lisbon, Portugal

History
If Lucy Fell was formed in 2004. 

The first demo CD was released in 2005 and with it, If Lucy Fell started touring through all the country, calling the interest of Rastilho Records in releasing their first long play.

In 2006, If Lucy Fell started to tour all over Europe in order to promote their first album, You Make Me Nervous. In 2007, they also did a Spanish tour.

In January 2008, Zebra Dance was released.

Current members
Makoto Yagyu - vocals
Rui Carvalho - guitar
Pedro "Gaza" Cobrado - bass
Hélio Morais - drums
João "Shela" Pereira - keyboards

Discography 
if lucy fell (2005) - Demo
You Make Me Nervous (2005) - Full Length
Zebra Dance (2008) - Full Length

External links
on MySpace.com
official website
If Lucy Fell, review on The Mag

Musical groups established in 2004
Post-hardcore groups
Portuguese punk rock groups